The Montana Stockgrowers Association (MSGA) is a non-profit membership organization that works on behalf of Montana cattle ranchers.

History 
According to Mons Teigen, former executive vice president of the Montana Stockgrowers Association, in his essay “A Century of Striving to Organized Strength” published in the Centennial Issue of the Montana Stockgrower in 1984:

“Prior to the 1880s, the young livestock industry on the great open ranges of Montana had little or no protection from the hazards of nature or man. Predators and diseases were attacking on one hand; rustlers and hungry Indians were taking their toll on the other.”

In the 1880s, cattlemen began forming groups and holding meetings across the territory to address these issues. None really stuck until a group—referred to by many different names, but most commonly known as the Eastern Montana Stockgrowers Association—was formed in 1883. Another group, known as the Montana Stockgrowers Association, reorganized and held its first meeting in July 1884 in Helena. The groups eventually merged in 1885.

In Miles City, on April 20, 1884, the Eastern Montana Stockgrowers Association met to discuss such issues as the overstocking of the range, Texas fever, and how to put a stop to the “rustling” of livestock on the open range. Granville Stuart in his book Forty Years on the Frontier claims that 429 stockmen were present, although this is most likely a very generous estimate, as most other meetings were attended by fewer than 100. This meeting is looked back on as a turning point in the organization of cattlemen in the Montana Territory.

Despite the other matters at hand, the topic of rustling soon overwhelmed the conversation and the group split into two sides; one side—including Theodore Roosevelt who ranched near the Montana border in Dakota, and the Marquis De Mores—favoring an all-out war against the rustlers, the other side in favor of restraint. Granville Stuart led the faction that supported restraint, although in private conversation, he had supported more decisive action against the rustlers. Granville Stuart wrote of the meeting:

“The civil laws and courts had been tried and found wanting. The Montana cattlemen were as peaceable and law-abiding a body of men as could be found anywhere but they had $35,000,000 worth of property scattered over seventy-five thousand square miles of practically uninhabited country and it must be protected from thieves. The only way to do it was to make the penalty for stealing so severe that it would lose its attractions. When the subject was brought up some of the members were for raising a small army of cowboys and raiding the country: but the older and more conservative men knew that that would never do.”

Stuart urged the group to consider that the rustlers were “strongly fortified” in cabins that were like “miniature fortresses.” He argued that the rustlers were well armed and stocked with ammunition, each of them “a desperado and a dead shot.” He also said that if a confrontation were to occur, the law would come down on the side of the rustlers. He did not want any cattlemen to stand trial for murder. In the end, the group voted to take no action against the rustlers.

T.A. Clay wrote in her article “A Call to Order: Law, Violence and the Development of Montana’s Early Stockmen’s Organizations” featured in the Autumn 2008 Issue of Montana The Magazine of Western History:

“Stuart’s opposition to a strike, however, was apparently a cover—an effort to rein in the group’s hotheads before they staked out a public position that would have ignited popular criticism. By calling for inaction, Stuart ensured that the cattlemen were on the record as being against harsh retribution. His position also gained the advantage of a surprise attack.”

Word got back to the rustlers that the Stockgrowers would not be taking any action and they became more brazen in their thefts, even stealing a prized stallion and other horses from Stuart’s own DHS Ranch. Just a few weeks after the tumultuous meeting in Miles City, Stuart held a meeting at his ranch where he directed the operations of a group of reliable and tight-lipped men, later known as “Stuart’s Stranglers.” They gathered intelligence on the rustlers and prepared to strike. Stuart’s Stranglers tracked down and killed at least thirty rustlers.

Legitimate and highly respected cattlemen, like Granville Stuart, were forced to band together to take action against rustlers since no laws were yet on the books to protect their interests. But they also pursued the enactment of such laws, which was one of the major reasons for the existence of the Stockgrower groups, both in Helena and in Miles City. In 1884, both groups campaigned extensively for stockmen candidates for the Territorial Legislature of 1885, which resulted in what is known as the “Cowboy Legislature.”

The Executive Committee of the Helena-based Stockgrowers group was in session during the entire Cowboy Legislature led by Granville Stuart, who became president of the association during the July 28, 1884 meeting (just shortly after his escapades to combat rustling). Bills that were passed during the Cowboy Legislature of 1885 included laws to prevent losses of livestock from theft and diseases. One law authorized the Governor to appoint a Territorial Veterinarian Surgeon to deal with disease in livestock. Another law was passed authorizing the governor to appoint six Livestock Commissioners in each of Dawson, Custer, Yellowstone, Meagher, Chouteau and Lewis and Clark Counties to appoint and employ inspectors and detectives to protect the livestock interests of the Territory from rustlers. Another law prohibited the branding of cattle on the public ranges during certain months. Also, a law was passed detailing the legal process for rounding up strays on public ranges.

It has a Board of Livestock which oversees the Department of Livestock, including its Brands Enforcement Division that protects ranchers from the theft of livestock through its brand laws and inspections.

The association has continued to work through state and national legislative and regulatory channels to achieve the goals and needs of its members in regards to issues such as cattle theft, cattle diseases, federal lands grazing, predators and endangered species, international trade, and taxes.

Local Organizations 
Montana Stockgrowers is affiliated with 24 local Stockgrower groups throughout Montana. Affiliation with the state organization allows local groups to bring forward resolutions that guide MSGA policies and allows Montana Stockgrowers to represent the interests of ranchers from across the state.

Associated Programs and Organizations 
Montana Stockgrowers Association administers programs for several other state-wide organizations in Montana:
Montana Public Lands Council
Montana Association of State Grazing Districts
Montana CattleWomen, Inc.

Montana Stockgrowers Association partners with, supports or affiliates with several state and national level organizations:
Montana Beef Council
Montana Beef Quality Assurance
Montana Ag Safety
National Cattlemen's Beef Association
Public Lands Council

References

External links 

1884 establishments in Montana Territory
Cattle in the United States
Food industry trade groups
Trade associations based in the United States
Organizations established in 1884